Vinjamuri (Telugu: వింజమూరి) is an Indian surname. Notable people with the name include:

 Vinjamuri Seetha Devi (died 2016), musician, singer, and scholar of Telugu folk music
 Vinjamuri Venkata Lakshmi Narasimha Rao (1887–?), Indian stage actor, Telugu-Sanskrit pandit and author

Indian surnames